East River Heights is a residential and mixed use neighborhood located in Ward 7 of Washington, DC. It is considered the "downtown"  area of the ward and has high walkability ratings. Its borders are East Capital Street, Minnesota Ave, Benning Road up to 41st Street. It is a neighborhood of retired and working people and many children. There is quite a bit of development occurring. The houses are small but have large yards. It is centrally located. 
It is located between the Minnesota Avenue and Benning Road  stations on the Washington Metro.

The neighborhood is considered a strong up and coming neighborhood, especially for young professionals in the area. Providing homes with yards makes it attractive to those who are considering starting a family. 

While maintaining its cultural identity, the neighborhood is making space for promising changes. Uber has invested in the community, operating one of their Greenlight hubs in the East River Park shopping center. 

Neighborhoods in Northeast (Washington, D.C.)